Imagenes (Images) may refer to:

Music
 Imágenes (band), a Peruvian rock band

Albums
 Imágenes (Lourdes Robles album)
 Imágenes (Verónica Castro album)